The Left United Front is a coalition of political parties in Kerala, India. The Left United Front was launched in March 2014, by the RMP, the SUCI-C and the MCPI(U). According to RMP state chairman T.L. Santhosh, the goal of the Left United Front is to fight "[...] against anti-people policies, corruption, communalism and murder politics of the existing fronts".

The front fielded M. Shajarkhan in the Thiruvananthapuram seat.

References

Political parties in Kerala
Political parties established in 2014
2014 establishments in Kerala